"Nothing to Do Town" is a song recorded by American country music singer Dylan Scott. It was released in April 2019 on his fourth EP Nothing to Do Town, and later included on his second studio album Livin' My Best Life. The song was written by Scott, Cole  Taylor and Matt Alderman, the latter of whom produced the song with Curt Gibbs and Jim Ed Norman.

Background
In an interview with Country Now, Scott explained the inspiration of the song: "It says what I wanted to say right now in my career. It’s just one of those songs about where I grew up. If you drove through my town of Bastrop, Louisiana, you would ask yourself, “what do people do here?” This is a ‘Nothing To Do Town.'” It just felt like the right single to put out."

Music video
The music video was released on December 18, 2018. Clips revealed Scott a day after growing up in Bastrop, Louisiana, and invited his friends and family to duck hunting, drive SUV and hang out with friends by bonfire.

Commercial performance
The song reached No.35 on Hot Country Songs chart. On July 28, 2020, the song obtained RIAA Gold certification.

Charts

Weekly charts

Year-end charts

Certifications

References

2019 songs
2019 singles
Dylan Scott songs
Songs written by Dylan Scott
Song recordings produced by Jim Ed Norman
Curb Records singles